Dergâh (Ottoman Turkish: Dervish lodge) was a literary magazine which was published during the final days of the Ottoman Empire in Istanbul from 1921 and 1922. This period witnessed the occupation of Istanbul by the Western forces and also, the Independence War.

History and profile
Dergâh was started in Istanbul in 1921 by Yahya Kemal and Ahmed Haşim. The former also served as the editor-in-chief of the magazine. The first issue appeared on 15 April 1921, one month after the Allied forces declared the occupation of Istanbul. Major contributors of the magazine included Hasan Ali Yücel and Abdülhak Şinasi who were adherents of the symbolist poetry. Ahmet Hamdi Tanpınar, a leading Turkish novelist, started his literary career in Dergâh. The following writers and journalists also contributed to the magazine: Halide Edib Adıvar, Nurullah Ataç, Falih Rıfkı Atay, Fuat Köprülü and Ziya Gökalp. Future politician Fevzi Lütfi Karaosmanoğlu started his journalistic career in the magazine. All these writers were supporters of the Independence War due to which some issues of the magazine were censored by the Allied administration.

Dergâh folded on 5 January 1922 after producing a total of forty-two issues.

References

1921 establishments in the Ottoman Empire
1922 disestablishments in the Ottoman Empire
Defunct literary magazines
Defunct magazines published in Turkey
Literary magazines published in Turkey
Magazines established in 1921
Magazines disestablished in 1922
Magazines published in Istanbul
Poetry literary magazines
Turkish-language magazines